Britannica is the Encyclopædia Britannica, a general knowledge English-language encyclopaedia.

Britannica may also refer to:

Publications
 Biographia Britannica, a multi-volume biographical compendium
 Insecta Britannica Diptera, a seminal work of entomology by Francis Walker
 Malayalam Britannica, a reference work in the Malayalam language
 Monumenta Historica Britannica, an incomplete work by Henry Petrie, the Keeper of the Records of the Tower of London
 Musica Britannica, an authoritative national collection of British music
 Papyrus Larousse Britannica, a Greek language encyclopedia

Other uses
 Classis Britannica, a provincial naval fleet of the navy of ancient Rome
 Felis Britannica, the UK national sub-federation of the Fédération Internationale Féline
 Inula britannica, a plant species
 Pax Britannica, the period of relative peace in Europe and the world (1815–1914)
 Undichna britannica, a fish-fin, or fish-swimming fossil trackway left as a fossil impression on a substrate

See also
 Encyclopædia Britannica, Inc., the publisher of the Encyclopædia Britannica
 Britannia (disambiguation)
 Britannic (disambiguation)
 Britannicus (AD 41–AD 55), the son of the Roman emperor Claudius